H.R. 5405, or the "Social Security Identity Theft Prevention Act" is a bill submitted to the U.S. House of Representatives on February 13, 2008, whose claimed purpose is: "To protect seniors from identity theft and strengthen our national security by providing for the issuance of a secure Social Security card. The bill states that certain "biometric identifiers" such as facial features, will be collected and stored in a government database to "protect seniors from identity theft" by enabling the government to scan people's faces to verify their identity.

The bill describes the new social security card as follows:

See also
 REAL ID
 Biometrics

References

Social security in the United States